Louis English (February 24, 1902 – July 9, 1976) was an American Negro league catcher from 1929 to 1932.

A native of Louisville, Kentucky, English made his Negro leagues debut in 1929 for the Detroit Stars. He went on to play for the Nashville Elite Giants, Louisville Black Caps, and Louisville White Sox. English died in Butte County, California in 1976 at age 74.

References

External links
 and Seamheads

1902 births
1976 deaths
Detroit Stars players
Louisville Black Caps players
Louisville White Sox players
Nashville Elite Giants players
Baseball catchers
Baseball players from Louisville, Kentucky
20th-century African-American sportspeople